Surekha Sikri (19 April 1945  16 July 2021) was an Indian theatre, film and television actress. She has received three National Film Awards, a Filmfare award and six Indian Television Academy awards, among others.

National Film Awards

Filmfare Awards

Filmfare OTT Awards

IIFA Awards

Indian Television Academy Awards

Indian Telly Awards

Screen Awards

Zee Cine Awards

Other Awards

References

Sikri, Surekha